Andrew James McBain (born 1971) is a Professor of Microbiology at the University of Manchester. His research is focused on the human microbiome, responses of biofilms to antimicrobial treatments, and the interaction of microorganisms colonising the skin, nasopharynx, oral cavity and intestine.

He graduated with a first-class degree in Microbiology from the University of Liverpool in 1993 and completed his PhD at Queens' College, Cambridge in 1997.

He was awarded the W H Pierce Prize of the Society for Applied Microbiology in 2005. He has an h-index of 48 according to Google Scholar.

References

1971 births
Living people
Alumni of the University of Liverpool
Alumni of Queens' College, Cambridge
Academics of the University of Manchester